Romy Gauchan Thakali is a Nepalese politician. He was elected to the Pratinidhi Sabha in the 1999 election on behalf of the Nepali Congress.

His son Yogesh Gauchan Thakali was elected to the House Of Representatives in 2022.

References

Living people
Nepali Congress politicians from Gandaki Province
Year of birth missing (living people)
Place of birth missing (living people)
Nepal MPs 1999–2002
Thakali people
Members of the 2nd Nepalese Constituent Assembly